Anthidium taschenbergi is a species of bee in the family Megachilidae, the leaf-cutter, carder, or mason bees.

Synonyms
Synonyms for this species include:
Anthidium (Anthidium) taschenbergi shirazense Mavromoustakis, 1968
Anthidium obtusispinum'' Pasteels, 1969

References

taschenbergi
Insects described in 1894